Rodeva is a rural locality (a village) in Yorgvinskoye Rural Settlement, Kudymkarsky District, Perm Krai, Russia. The population was 20 as of 2010.

Geography 
Rodeva is located 20 km northeast of Kudymkar (the district's administrative centre) by road. Lyachkanova is the nearest rural locality.

References 

Rural localities in Kudymkarsky District